Amr El Abbadi is a Distinguished Professor of Computer Science at the University of California, Santa Barbara. He obtained B.Eng. and Ph.D. degrees from Alexandria and Cornell universities respectively. He is an editor of the VLDB Journal and IEEE Transactions on Computers. He was named Fellow of the Institute of Electrical and Electronics Engineers (IEEE) in 2014 ''for contributions to the design of fault-tolerant large-scale data management systems.

Prof. El Abbadi's research addresses the scalability and management of data. It has applications in astronomy, biology, physics, as well as network analysis and data mining. At the same time, as people and enterprises depend increasingly on storing private data in databases on computers, issues of privacy and security become of paramount importance.

The focus of Prof. El Abbadi's research is to explore novel methods to solve these scalability problems in a reliable, efficient, and privacy-preserving manner. His approach uses novel techniques and can be categorized as methods using novel hardware solutions, methods using efficient mathematical tools, and methods using good old software solutions for storage management.

El Abbadi is the son of the historian Mostafa El Abbadi.

References

External links

1958 births
Living people
Egyptian computer scientists
Alexandria University alumni
Cornell University alumni
University of California, Santa Barbara faculty
Fellow Members of the IEEE
Egyptian expatriates in the United States